Lorentz Henrik Segelcke Dietrichson (1 January 1834 Bergen - 6 March 1917) was a Norwegian poet and historian of art and literature.

Biography

Lorentz Henrik Segelcke Dietrichson was the son of Fredrik Dietrichson (1800–52) and Marie Heiberg Dahl (1808–83). Dietrichson grew up in Bergen as an only child in a home of cultural officials interested in the parents' social circle.  While an undergraduate in the University of Christiania, he composed many clever student songs which were collected and published in 1859. After school graduation in 1853 at the University of Christiania and other exams the following year he began to study theology, but he was more keen to cultivate their literary and artistic interests. In 1862 he married painter Johanne Mathilde Bonnevie. 

For a time he served as instructor at Uppsala University and subsequently for three years was secretary to the Norwegian minister at Rome. On his return he became connected with the administration of the Nationalmuseum in Stockholm. In 1869, he was appointed professor in the Royal Swedish Academy of Arts in Stockholm. Six years later he moved to the University of Christiania as professor of the history of art.

Dietrichson was a well-known participator in the public health debate in both Norway and neighboring Sweden, and as such, he was known for his opposition toward corsets, which at this point in time was a serious health issue, and as such supported the Swedish Dress Reform Society, and notably helped to spread the movement to Norway.

He published several volumes mostly dealing with Norwegian art in the Middle Ages. He published  Læredigtet i Nordens poetiske Literatur  (1860), Kivle-Slaatten. Thema og Variationer over et norsk Folkesagn. Et polemisk Digt (1879) and numerous other works. After examining  Danish  and Swedish 18th century literature,  he published two-volume Omrids af den norske Poesis Historie (1866-1869). It was the first presentation of Norway's history and development of literature from folk tales.

Selected works

Olaf Liljekrands. Et Digt, 1858
Samfundsviser og Sange af Jørgen Latiner, 1859
Læredigtet i Nordens poetiske Literatur, 1860
Den bildende Kunst i dens historiske Forhold til Religionsformerne. Et indledende kunsthistorisk Omrids, 1862
Indledning i Studiet af Sveriges Literatur i vort Aarhundrede, 1862
En arbetare. Skådespel i tre akter, 1872 
 Karl Folkunge. Dramatisk dikt i fyra akter, 1874
Adolph Tidemand, hans Liv og hans Værker. Et bidrag til den norske Kunsts Historie, 1878–79
Den norske Treskjærerkunst, dens Oprindelse og Udvikling. En foreløbig Undersøgelse, 1878
Kivle-Slaatten. Thema og Variationer over et norsk Folkesagn. Et polemisk Digt, 1879
Christusbilledet. Studier over den typiske Christusfremstillings Oprindelse, Udvikling og Opløsning, 1880
Michelagniolo. En biografisk studi, 1880
Skulpturmuseets Samling af Afstøbninger og originale Billedhuggerarbejder. En historisk-kritisk Beskrivelse, 1881
Nationalgalleriets Samling af Malerier og Billedhuggerarbeider. En historisk-kritisk Beskrivelse, 1882
Antinoos. Eine kunstarchäologische Untersuchung, 1884
Fra Kunstens Verden. Foredrag og Studier, 1885
Det norske Nationalgalleri. Dets tilblivelse og udvikling i anledning af dets 50-aarige tilværelse, 1887
De norske stavkirker. Studier over deres system, oprindelse og historiske utvikling. Et bidrag til Norges middelalderske bygningskunsts historie, 1892
Camilla Collett og hendes Indlæg i Kvindesagen, 1894
[https://books.google.com/books?id=EzVkYh-mng4C Gude. En biografisk Skizze], 1898–99Vore fædres Verk. Norges Kunst i Middelalderen. En populær Fremstilling'', 1906

References

Other sources

1834 births
1917 deaths
19th-century Norwegian poets
Norwegian male poets
19th-century Norwegian historians
University of Oslo alumni
Academic staff of the University of Oslo
19th-century Norwegian male writers